Rahim AlHaj (born c. 1968) is an Iraqi American oud musician and composer.

Early life
AlHaj was born in Baghdad, Iraq and began playing the oud (an Arabic lute) at age nine.  Early on, it was evident that he had a remarkable talent for playing the oud.

Education
AlHaj studied under the renowned Munir Bashir, considered by many to be the greatest oud player ever, and Salim Abdul Kareem, at the Institute of Music in Baghdad, Iraq. AlHaj won various awards at the conservatory and graduated in 1990 with a diploma in composition.  He also holds a degree in Arabic literature from Mustansiriya University in Baghdad.

Emigration
In 1991, after the first Gulf War, AlHaj was forced to leave Iraq due to his political activism against the Saddam Hussein regime and began his life in Jordan and Syria. He moved to the U.S. in 2000 as a political refugee and has resided in Albuquerque, New Mexico, ever since. He became a U.S. citizen on August 16, 2008.

Career
AlHaj has performed all over the world, on tour with Munir Bashir, his teacher, as well as solo and with his string quartet project, including numerous concerts in Lebanon, Iraq, Syria, Jordan, Morocco, Tunisia, Kuwait, Bahrain, Egypt, and France and hundreds of concerts in the United States.

AlHaj has released several recordings. The Second Baghdad, released in 2002, and Iraqi Music in a Time of War, released in 2003, were both produced by VoxLox record label.  His East meets West CD entitled Friendship (Rahim AlHaj, Oud & Sadaqa Quartet) was released in December 2005 by Fast Horse Recordings. His When the Soul is Settled: Music of Iraq, produced by Smithsonian Folkways, was released in June 2006, and nominated for a 2008 Grammy Award.  An oud and sarod CD with Amjad Ali Khan will be released later in the year.

AlHaj's music delicately combines traditional Iraqi maqams with contemporary styling and influence. His compositions are about the experience of exile from his homeland and of new beginnings in his adopted country. He is one of the true oud masters from Iraq. AlHaj says that "my music invites the listener to discover the true spirit of the musician." His compositions are about loss, hope, freedom, and longing. His songs establish new concepts without altering the foundation of the traditional Iraqi School of oud based in Baghdad.

AlHaj wrote and performed the music for the award-winning short documentary, The Rest of My Life: Stories of Trauma Survivors.

Awards

2015: Recipient of a National Heritage Fellowship awarded by the National Endowment for the Arts
2010: Grammy nomination for Best Traditional World Music Album
2009: United States Artists Fellow Award in Music
2008: Grammy nomination for Best Traditional World Music Album
2003: Winner of the Bravo Award for Excellence in Music
2001: Award from Veterans for Peace for work towards peace
1988: Music Institute Award for Composition

See also
Music of Iraq

References

External links

Kennedy Center performance on June 6, 2006
Rahim Alhaj "featured artist profile" on Smithsonian Folkways

Interviews
Rahim AlHaj interview from Weekend America radio program, May 15, 2008

1968 births
Living people
American male composers
American oud players
Iraqi composers
Iraqi emigrants to the United States
Iraqi oud players
Musicians from Baghdad
Musicians from Albuquerque, New Mexico
Al-Mustansiriya University alumni
National Heritage Fellowship winners